Jadup and Boel is a 1980 East German drama film directed by Rainer Simon. It was entered into the 16th Moscow International Film Festival in 1989.

Cast
 Kurt Böwe as Jadup
 Katrin Knappe as Boel Martin
 Gudrun Ritter as Barbara Jadup
 Timo Jakob as Max Jadup (as Timo Jacob)
 Käthe Reichel as Frau Martin
 Franciszek Pieczka as Willi Unger
 Heide Kipp as Frau Unger
 Michael Gwisdek as Herr Gwissen
 Rolf-Martin Kruckenberg as Leutnant Wenzel
 Christian Böwe as Der junge Jadup
 Dirk Nawrocki as Junger Wenzel

References

External links
 

1980 films
1980 drama films
1980s German-language films
German drama films
East German films
Films directed by Rainer Simon
1980s German films